William Swenson (born October 26, 1973) is an American actor and singer best known for his work in musical theatre. He also has developed a film career, primarily in LDS cinema.

Early life
Swenson was born in Provo, Utah. Two of his grandparents, James Nathan Hale and Ruth Hale, were playwrights; Ruth was also an actor.

Swenson moved throughout the United States during his childhood. He attended Brigham Young University and later served as a missionary for the Church of Jesus Christ of Latter-day Saints in Guayaquil-Ecuador. As of 2008, he was no longer practicing the LDS faith.

Career
Swenson is known among members of the LDS Church for his role as Jonathan Jordan in the LDS Cinema movie The Singles Ward (2002) and its sequel, The Singles 2nd Ward (2007). Swenson co-wrote, directed and acted in the LDS Cinema mockumentary Sons of Provo (2004).

Swenson appeared on Broadway in Lestat, 110 in the Shade and Brooklyn.  Off Broadway, he played the role of Stacee Jaxx in the musical Rock of Ages but did not go on to perform the role on Broadway because he was offered the starring role of Berger in the Broadway revival of Hair. He played Sir Sagramore in Camelot at Lincoln Center and Chris in the second national tour of Miss Saigon.

He played the role of Berger in the off-Broadway 40th Anniversary Concert of Hair opposite Karen Olivo.  In 2008, Swenson was again cast as Berger in The Public Theater's revival of the show in Central Park. He went on to reprise the role when the production moved to Broadway in March 2009. He received critical acclaim for his performance on Broadway and was nominated for a Tony Award for Best Performance by a Featured Actor in a Musical. He played the role of Berger again in the West End revival of Hair which began performances on April 1, 2010, and ended his limited engagement on May 29, 2010. Audra McDonald and Swenson reprised their roles in a two-week fundraising production of 110 in the Shade at the Hale Center Theater in Orem, Utah.

On October 8, 2009, Swenson appeared as in the guest cameo slot for the extension performance of Katie Thompson's R.R.R.E.D.: A Secret Musical, as part of the 2009 New York Musical Theatre Festival.  In 2010, Swenson played the lead role of "Tick"/"Mitzi" in the pre-Broadway North American company of Priscilla: Queen of the Desert in Toronto, Canada.

In October 2013, Swenson was cast as Inspector Javert in the 2014 Broadway revival of Les Misérables, which opened in March 2014 at New York's Imperial Theatre, where the musical had previously run for 13 years.

In 2018, Swenson played Satan in the New Group's off-Broadway production of Jerry Springer: The Opera. In 2020, he appeared in the Netflix show Chilling Adventures of Sabrina as Pan.

In June of 2022 Swenson began playing the role of Neil Diamond (Then) in the new musical "A Beautiful Noise, The Neil Diamond Musical" at the Emerson Colonial Theatre in Boston. The show is scheduled to move to Broadway later in 2022 with its Broadway opening scheduled for December 4, 2022 at the Broadhurst Theatre in New York City. The musical is based on the life and music of Neil Diamond and Swenson has said he grew up surrounded by and loving Neil Diamond's music. Swenson has said his father loved Neil Diamond's music and in his youth Swenson would sing Neil Diamond songs and eventually even sang the songs trying to sound like Neil Diamond.

Personal life
Swenson met his first wife, Amy Westerby, while they were both in one of his grandmother's comedies, Hopsville Holiday. The couple have two sons, Bridger and Sawyer; they have since divorced.

Swenson and actress Audra McDonald became engaged in January 2012 and were married on October 6, 2012. In October 2016, McDonald and Swenson had their first child, Sally.

Theatre credits

Filmography

Film

Television

Web series

Awards and nominations

References

External links
 
 
 
Will Swenson at IOBDB

1973 births
20th-century Mormon missionaries
Male actors from Utah
American male singers
American Mormon missionaries in Ecuador
American male musical theatre actors
Former Latter Day Saints
Living people
Musicians from Provo, Utah
21st-century American male actors
American male film actors
American male television actors
Writers from Provo, Utah